Carrera Séptima (Seventh Street), also known as Eduardo Posada Flórez Avenue, is one of the principal transit arteries which crosses the eastern side of Bogotá north and south. It is the most important thoroughfare of the city in the sense of history, culture, economy, and society. Carrera Séptima is bound to the east by the Eastern Hills.

Points of interest 

Carrera Séptima passes through the localities of Usaquén, Chapinero, Santa Fe, and La Candelaria.

Usaquén 
 The Usaquén historic zone
 El Centro Comercial Hacienda Santa Bárbara
 El Centro Empresarial Santa Bárbara
 El Cantón Norte del Ejército
 El Complejo América Centro Mundial de Negocios

Chapinero 
 Parque Museo del Chicó
 Avenida Chile (Calle 72) Financial District
 Universidad Distrital Francisco José de Caldas
 Pontifical Xavierian University

Santa Fe 
 Parque Nacional Enrique Olaya Herrera (Parque Nacional)
 The National Museum of Colombia
 Centro Internacional de Bogotá
 Centro Comercial Terraza Pasteur
 Torre Colpatria
 Banco de la República
 Iglesia de Las Nieves
 Iglesia de San Francisco 
 Parque Santander

La Candelaria 
 Bolívar Square
 Primatial Cathedral of Bogotá
 Capitolio Nacional
 Casa de Nariño

Gallery

References

External links 

  Patrimoniocultural.gov

Streets in Bogotá